Nádia Gomes Colhado (born February 25, 1989) is a Brazilian professional basketball player who currently plays for Gernika KESB of Spain's Liga Femenina de Baloncesto. She has competed for the Brazil women's national basketball team at the 2012 and 2016 Summer Olympics, the 2014 FIBA World Championship for Women, and FIBA Americas tournaments.

During the 2013–14 Brazilian championship, Colhado played with Érika de Souza and Tiffany Hayes, both from the WNBA's Atlanta Dream, for Sport Recife. While Dream coach Michael Cooper visited his players, he was impressed with Colhado and invited her to the team's training camp prior to the 2014 WNBA season. She eventually passed the tests to join Atlanta, and despite having limited minutes due to the Dream's abundance of centers, took part in 16 games of the regular season. Colhado played 6 more games in the 2015 WNBA season before being waived by the Dream. During the 2016–17 season, she played in Spain, in IDK Gipuzkoa from San Sebastian and she became the MVP of the competition. In 2017, Colhado signed with the Fever. In the offseason, she played for another Spanish team, Uni Girona.

Non-WNBA club history
 Divino/COC/Jundiaí (Brazil)
 Universidad Leon (Spain)
 São Caetano (Brazil)
 Santo André (Brazil)
 São José (Brazil)
 Sport Recife (Brazil)
 Sampaio Basquete (Brazil)
 IDK Gipuzkoa (Spain)
 Uni Girona (Spain)
 Flammes Carolo Basket (France)
 Gernika KESB (Spain)

References

1989 births
Living people
Atlanta Dream players
Brazilian expatriate basketball people in the United States
Brazilian expatriate basketball people in Spain
Brazilian expatriate basketball people in France
Basketball players at the 2012 Summer Olympics
Basketball players at the 2016 Summer Olympics
Brazilian women's basketball players
Centers (basketball)
Indiana Fever players
Olympic basketball players of Brazil
Sportspeople from Paraná (state)